In 2015, Nepal introduced constitutional recognition for "gender and sexual minorities". Despite this, the rights situation of intersex people in Nepal is unclear. Local activists have identified human rights violations, including significant gaps in protection of rights to physical integrity and bodily autonomy, and protection from discrimination. A first national meeting of intersex people look place in early 2016,Organised by First openly Intersex Rights Activist Esan Regmi in Nepal. with support from the  UNDP.

Terminology
Intersex people are termed as 'antarlingi' अन्तरलिङ्गी in Nepali language.

History

The Blue Diamond Society, established in 2001, in Nepal politically has pursued political and social rights. On December 21, 2007, the Supreme Court ruled that a new democratic government must create laws to protect LGBTI rights and change existing laws that were tantamount to discrimination. In September 2015, several articles mentioning the rights of gender and sexual minorities in the country's new constitution were approved by Parliament after lengthy deliberation. Amongst these:
 Article 12 states that people have the right to have citizenship identification that reflects their preferred gender.
 Article 18 covers rights to equality and states that the State will not "discriminate [against] any citizens based on origin, religion, race, caste, tribe, gender, language or ideological conviction or any other status."
 Article 18 also lists "minorities, marginalized, youth, children, senior citizens, gender and sexual minorities, handicapped persons" asdisadvantaged groups that are recognized by the constitution.

The constitution went into effect on 20 September 2015. These changes mean that Nepal is likely the most progressive country in South Asia, for LGBT rights. Nevertheless, numerous difficulties are reported by intersex people in Nepal, including the right to change gender assignment, the right to bodily autonomy, and the right to health.

In February 2018, Asian intersex activists published the Statement of Intersex Asia and the Asian Intersex Forum, setting out local demands.

Intersex issues in Nepal may often be thought to be third sex issues, and the most well-known third-gender group in South Asia is perhaps the hijra. Serena Nanda writes that: "There is a widespread belief in India that hijras are born hermaphrodites [intersex] and are taken away by the hijra community at birth or in childhood, but I found no evidence to support this belief among the hijras I met, all of whom joined the community voluntarily, often in their teens." This belief has an impact when infants are born. Warne and Raza argue that an association between intersex and hijra people is mostly unfounded but provokes parental fear about the possible future life of their child.

Physical integrity and bodily autonomy 

Intersex persons are not protected from violations to physical integrity and bodily autonomy. A 2016 book of personal stories by intersex people from Nepal identifies a range of bodily autonomy and health issues, including "Intersex genital mutilation as a growing practice and lack of information and access to reproductive health information or care" and "Lack of access to necessary health care for those experiencing health difficulties as a result of their intersex variation".

In June 2016, the United Nations Committee on the Rights of the Child questioned the Nepalese government, and identified concerns about:

The Committee called for investigations of human rights violations, education of medical professionals, and access to redress.

Protection from discrimination

While the 2015 constitution provides protection for sexual and gender minorities, disabled people, and minorities more generally, Esan Regmi has identified a number of issues facing intersex people in Nepal, including discrimination, and a lack of intersex-specific research and actions within Nepal's LGBTI movement. Access to marriage and inheritance rights are also concerns.

Identification documents

According to local intersex activists, intersex people are not able to change name or gender marker on Nepalese birth certificates, and also have difficulties in updating academic transcripts and citizenship certificates. Intersex people are often confused as 'third gender' which creates barrier in recognition.

On 26 October 2020 the intersex community of Nepal laid seven bullet demands on gender recognition as follows:-
 Ensure intersex infants' right to birth certificate, as an infant be marked as 'intersex' and later on as male, female or non-binary based on their gender identity.
 Ensure intersex people's right to change name and gender marker.
 Ensure self-determination.
 Ensure use of correct gendered terms.
 Ensure right to privacy on one's intersex status, medical records and personal gender history.
 Ensure dignity, bodily integrity & autonomy.
 Remove obligatory 'other gender' or 'third gender' marking to intersex people

Rights advocacy
On February 8–9, 2016, and with the support of the UNDP and other organizations, the Blue Diamond Society hosted a first national meeting on intersex issues. The meeting was led by Esan Regmi, with 13 participants from around Nepal.

Organizations
The first Intersex Rights organization and the only one till date  of Nepal is Campaign for Change.

See also
 Intersex human rights
 Blue Diamond Society
 LGBT rights in Nepal
 Hijra (South Asia)
 Human rights in Nepal
 National LGBTI Day (Nepal)

References

Bibliography
 
 

 
LGBT rights in Nepal
Law of Nepal